Terra Nova Church  is a church in Visby, on the Swedish island Gotland. The church was designed by Hans Wieland and was inaugurated in 1983. It was inaugurated by Bishop .

References

Churches in Gotland County
Churches completed in 1983
Church of Sweden churches
20th-century Church of Sweden church buildings